The following ships of the Indian Navy have been named INS Nipat:

Indian Navy ship names